is a Japanese actress and voice actress. She is a member of the Haiyuza Troupe.

Works

Stage performances
 Neal Simon Memoirs (2001)
 Tomodachi (2002)
 Boku no Tōkyō Nikki (2002)
 Kamome (2002)
 Tartuffe (2004)

Voice acting
 Uninhabited Planet Survive! - Sharla

Dubbing roles
 Curse of the Golden Flower - Jiang Chan (Li Man)

References

Japanese actresses
Living people
People from Osaka Prefecture
1980 births